Solomon DeLong (born February 8, 1849, Schnecksville, Pennsylvania-February 2, 1925, Allentown, Pennsylvania) was an American Pennsylvania Dutch language writer and journalist. 

DeLong was a teacher, businessman, and, for twelve years, Pennsylvania German columnist for The Morning Call in Allentown, Pennsylvania, where he wrote under the pen name Obediah Grouthomel. DeLong provided the Pennsylvania German language translation of Clement Clarke Moore's poem A Visit from St. Nicholas (also known as The Night before Christmas). The Pennsylvania German language translation of the poem was first printed in The Morning Call on December 24, 1920.

References

1849 births
1925 deaths
People from Lehigh County, Pennsylvania
American male journalists
American poets in Pennsylvania Dutch
American writers in Pennsylvania Dutch
Educators from Allentown, Pennsylvania
Pennsylvania Dutch people
Writers from Allentown, Pennsylvania
Pennsylvania Dutch culture
Pennsylvania Dutch language
Journalists from Pennsylvania